Kasey Ann Moore (born August 3, 1987) is an American former soccer defender who played for Boston Breakers of Women's Professional Soccer. She was a member of the United States women's national under-23 soccer team.

References

External links
 US Soccer player profile
 Boston Breakers player profile
 Texas player profile

1987 births
Living people
Women's association football defenders
Soccer players from Riverside, California
Boston Breakers players
Texas Longhorns women's soccer players
USL W-League (1995–2015) players
American women's soccer players
Boston Aztec (WPSL) players
Women's Premier Soccer League players
Women's Professional Soccer players